Emamzadeh Yujan (also Romanized as Emāmzādeh Yūjān) is a village in Salehan Rural District, in the Central District of Khomeyn County, Markazi Province, Iran. At the 2006 census, its population was 276, in 91 families.

References 

Populated places in Khomeyn County